Morangis may refer to the following communes in France:
 Morangis, Essonne
 Morangis, Marne